Bhuvnesh Bal Vidyalaya, previously known as Bal Vidyalaya, is a private Senior Secondary School in Kota in the Indian state of Rajasthan.

The school was built on land allotted by Rajasthan Government to  Honourable Mr. Bhuvnesh Chaturvedi (Former State Minister). Dr. V.K.R.V. Rao (then Minister of Education) laid the foundation stone on 24 May 1970. The building was inaugurated on 25 July 1974 by Shri Mohan Lal Sukhadia, then Governor of Karnataka

References

Schools in Rajasthan
Education in Kota, Rajasthan